The criminal law in the Sasanian Empire followed the same model as the Zoroastrian law, which had the intention to punish the individual in order to save the latters soul from the otherworldly consequences of the offense. The purpose of punishment in Zoroastrian law was to save the condemned's soul from the supernatural consequences of lawbreaking. People who were punished in life were purged of their sins and spared divine punishment after death. Due to punitive punishment being considered beneficial, torture was rationalized and confessions could be extorted during torture. The chronicle of Matigan-i Hazar Datistan ("Book of a Thousand Judgements") makes mention of punishments in Zoroastrian law.

The most prevalent punishment specified is lashing, with lawbreaking acts being theoretically differentiated in harshness by the number of lashes, even up to unreasonable levels. Amputation of the nose was favored for adultery. Bandits and Christians were stomped by elephants, the most notable occurrence being during the reign of king (shah) Shapur II, who had the city of Susa destroyed with 300 elephants in order to suppress a rebellion.

The same punishment methods did not apply to the Sasanian royal family, whose blood was considered clean. Thus asphyxiation in ashes or garroting were the favoured techniques for the execution of princes. Another method was to have them mutilated, since disfigured princes were not allowed to claim the throne.

References

Sources 
 
 
 

Corporal punishments
Mutilation
Sasanian law